Nelson Mandela University Sports Stadium commonly referred to as Madibaz Stadium, is an athletics stadium in Protea Road, on the South Campus of Nelson Mandela University in Port Elizabeth, South Africa.

The stadium hosts Nelson Mandela University Madibaz Rugby home matches, including Varsity Cup matches. It also hosts Nelson Mandela University Madibaz Soccer matches during Varsity Football, and athletics meetings.

The stadium was used as a training facility during the 2010 FIFA World Cup and 2013 Africa Cup of Nations.

Professional matches

References

Buildings and structures in Port Elizabeth
Nelson Mandela University
Rugby union stadiums in South Africa
Multi-purpose stadiums in South Africa
Soccer venues in South Africa